HMAS Warrnambool (J202), named for the city of Warrnambool, Victoria was one of 60 Bathurst-class corvettes constructed during World War II, and one of 36 initially manned and commissioned solely by the Royal Australian Navy (RAN). Warrnambool sank after she hit a mine in the Great Barrier Reef on 13 September 1947. She was one of only four Bathurst class corvettes lost while in Australian service, and the only one lost after World War II.

Design and construction

In 1938, the Australian Commonwealth Naval Board (ACNB) identified the need for a general purpose 'local defence vessel' capable of both anti-submarine and mine-warfare duties, while easy to construct and operate. Construction of the prototype  did not go ahead, but the plans were retained. The need for locally built 'all-rounder' vessels at the start of World War II saw the "Australian Minesweepers" (designated as such to hide their anti-submarine capability, but popularly referred to as "corvettes") approved in September 1939, with 60 constructed during the course of the war: 36 (including Warrnambool) ordered by the RAN, 20 ordered by the British Admiralty but manned and commissioned as RAN vessels, and 4 for the Royal Indian Navy.

Morts Dock & Engineering Co laid Warrnambool down in Sydney on 13 November 1940. She was launched on 8 May 1941 by Mrs Simpson, wife of a shipyard Director, and commissioned on 23 September 1941.

Operational history
Warrnambool began her career with patrols of Bass Strait, before heading to northern waters. She was in Darwin during the bombing of Darwin on 19 February 1942, although she was not damaged. A day later she was involved in the rescue of 73 crew from the Filipino merchant vessel , following attacks by Japanese dive bombers. During the rescue, the Japanese attacked Warrnambool but she received only minor damage. Over the next 12 months Warrnambool was involved in five evacuations or rescues (including that of HMAS Voyager’s crew following the destroyer running aground in September 1942), present for eighteen Japanese air raids, and transported over 4,000 troops to New Guinea.

In late 1942, the corvette moved to the east coast of Australia, where she remained until September 1944, performing convoy escort and anti-submarine patrols. Following this Warrnambool was assigned to Fremantle, Western Australia, where she performed similar duties until February 1945, when she returned to Darwin. She was present at the Japanese surrender at Koepang, Timor, on 11 September 1945.

Following the conclusion of World War II, Warrnambool performed mine clearance work in the Solomon and New Guinea Islands before moving to the Great Barrier Reef. While performing clearance work on 13 September 1947, the corvette hit a mine around 16:00 near Cockburn Reef, off the northern Queensland coast. Four sailors were killed and another 29 were injured. The wreck was sold to Southern Cross Diving and Salvage on 3 July 1972. A Board of Inquiry found that there was no culpable negligence in the loss of the corvette, and praised the conduct of her crew and commanding officer. Warrnambool is the only RAN ship to be sunk by a mine. A survey conducted in 2016 by  found that the wreck of Warrnambool remained largely intact.

The corvette's wartime service was recognised with three battle honours: "Darwin 1942", "Pacific 1942–45", and "New Guinea 1942".

Citations

References
Books

Journal and news articles

External links

Bathurst-class corvettes of the Royal Australian Navy
Ships built in New South Wales
1941 ships
World War II corvettes of Australia
Maritime incidents in 1947
Ships sunk by mines
Shipwrecks of Queensland